Walking the Streets of Moscow (I walk across Moscow) is a 1964 Soviet film directed by Georgiy Daneliya and produced by Mosfilm studios. It stars Nikita Mihalkov, Aleksei Loktev, Yevgeny Steblov and Galina Polskikh. The film also features four People's Artists of the USSR: Rolan Bykov, Vladimir Basov, Lev Durov, and Inna Churikova. The famous movie theme, performed by Mikhalkov, was written by the composer Andrey Petrov. The film, regarded as one of the most characteristic of the Khrushchev Thaw, premiered at the 1964 Cannes Film Festival and won a prize for the work of cameraman Vadim Yusov, best known for his subsequent collaboration with Andrei Tarkovsky.

Plot summary
The film opens at a Moscow airport in summer 1963. A young man, Volodya (Aleksei Loktev), calls out to a young woman he sees singing to herself and dancing. 
– Arriving or departing?
– Waiting for arrivals.
– Who is it?
– My husband.
– He's lucky to have someone to meet him.
– Get married, you'll have someone as well.
– And you are both happy?
– Yes, we are.
– It never happens.
– Believe me, it happens.

Volodya is an aspiring writer from Siberia. His first short story has just been published in the magazine Yunost ("Youth"); and a famous author, Voronin, has invited him to Moscow to discuss his work. In the Moscow Metro Volodya unexpectedly makes a friend, Kolya (Nikita Mikhalkov), who is returning home after a hard night shift. Volodya wants to stay at his old friends' home, but he doesn't know where the necessary street is so Kolya decided to help him to find it.

Unfortunately, a dog bites Volodya near Clean Ponds. Then Kolya decided to help his new friend againthey both came to Kolya's home where Kolya sews Volodya's trousers and introduces him to Kolya's large family. Volodya recognised that his old Moscow friends aren't in Moscow (they left for south) and Volodya stays at Kolya's. Then Volodya goes for a walk.

At last alone, Kolya decided to sleep, but then came his old friend Sasha (Yevgeny Steblov). Sasha is in troublehe was planning on marrying his fiancée Sveta today, but he has been called up for military service. He begs Kolya to help him. Kolya helps. Then two young men go to the GUM department store to buy a suit for a bridegroom and they meet Volodya there (Volody has recently bought a new suit for himself). Then friends decided to buy a present for a bride and they go to the music shop, because the saleswoman, Alyona (Galina Polskikh) is a love interest for Kolya...

Cast
Aleksei Loktev –  Volodya
Nikita Mikhalkov – Kolka
Galina Polskikh –  Alyona
Yevgeny Steblov – Sasha
Irina Titova – Sveta
Irina Miroshnichenko – Katya, Kolka's sister
Lyubov Sokolova –  Kolka's mother
Yekaterina Melnikova – Kolka's grandmother
Arkadiy Smirnov  –  Aleksey Petrovich Voronov, writer
Vladimir Basov  – floor polisher
Rolan Bykov – Man in Park
Valentina Ananina – ice-cream vendor 
Veronika Vasilyeva – mistress of ceremonies
Irina Skobtseva – Nadya 
Inna Churikova – girl participating in the playful contest
Maria Vinogradova – woman with a dog
Gennadiy Yalovich – tour guide
Alevtina Rumiantseva – underground guard
Vladimir Shurupov – Viktor, Kolka's brother
Danuta Stolyarskaya – Anya, Viktor's wife
Boris Balakin – taxi driver
Boris Bityukov – Alyona's father
Pyotr Dolzhanov –  passerby
Lev Durov –  militsioner
Arina Aleynikova – girl at the airport
Igor Bogolybov – military commissar
Vadim Shilov – underground squabbler
Anna Pavlova –  secretary at the military commissariat
Viktor Volkov – construction foreman
Viktor Shkurin – thief
Uno Masaaki – Japanese man
Svetlana Besedina – girl in the rain
Oleg Vidov – boy on the bike
Georgiy Daneliya – shoeshine man

Legacy
This film was highly beloved by Soviet youth in the early 1960s. Though its plot is a bit naive and unpretentious, it showed how wonderful life was, gives hope and tries to look at the unpleasant things in an optimistic way. The song by the same name from the film is still popular and became the unofficial hymn of Moscow youth.

The popularity of this film was low in the 1970s but rose again in the 1980s in contrast to contemporaneous "chernukha" ("black") films, gloomy satirical and social dramas with philosophical motifs. Nowadays it is still very famous.

There are new versions of the song by some 1990s Russian rock groups (for example, Nogu Svelo!) and also a film remake, The Heat, which was commercially successfully but critically panned.

References

External links

  Walking the Streets of Moscow on MosFilm video channel

1964 films
1960s Russian-language films
1964 romantic comedy films
Mosfilm films
Films set in Moscow
Films shot in Moscow
Films directed by Georgiy Daneliya
Films scored by Andrey Petrov
Soviet romantic comedy films
Russian romantic comedy films